James Hersey (* born July 15 1988) is an Austrian-American pop singer and songwriter from Vienna.

Life 
Hersey learned to play percussion and cello in his youth before switching to guitar. He played in punk rock bands and sang in a high school choir before switching to popular music, releasing his debut EP in 2010. He signed with Glassnote Records in 2012. He scored two hits in Austria and Germany - "How Hard I Try", with Filous, reached #96 in Germany and #33 in Austria in 2015, and "Miss You" reached #90 in Germany and #61 in Austria in 2016. He also was featured on the track "Coming Over" by Dillon Francis and Kygo, which reached #40 in the US Billboard Mainstream Top 40 chart and #1 on the Dance/Club Play chart. "Miss You" and "Coming Over" were both described by Billboard as "generating millions of plays" on the streaming service Spotify.

Discography

Albums 
 2015: Clarity
 2019: Innerverse

EPs 
 2011: James Hersey
 2017: Pages

Mixtapes 
 2012: Twelve

Singles 
 2011: Stand Up for You
 2011: It Ain’t Over
 2012: All I Want
 2012: Forever Yours
 2013: High Five
 2014: Juliet
 2014: Don’t Say Maybe
 2015: What I’ve Done
 2015: Coming Over (filous Remix)
 2015: How Hard I Try (mit filous)
 2016: Miss You
 2018: Real For You
 2018: Let Go (feat. filous)
 2019: My People (mit Jeremy Loops)
 2019: Hands on Me (mit ELI)
 2020: Forget (About Everyone Else)

Guest Contributions 
 2016: Coming Over (Dillon Francis & Kygo feat. James Hersey)
 2017: Like I Do (Camo & Krooked feat. James Hersey)

Music Awards

References

Living people
21st-century Austrian male singers
Musicians from Vienna
Year of birth missing (living people)
Glassnote Records artists